The 2016 Hazfi Cup Final was the 29th final since 1975. The match was an wonderful for both teams to get a chance to clinch a title after a good season. Zob Ahan was the defending champion in the competition, if they won it would their first time in the club history to win any competition back-to-back. Zob Ahan had the lead but Esteghlal equalized it at the second half. There was nothing to separate the two teams in the extra-time, Esteghlal lost to Zob Ahan in penalties. Zob Ahan qualified for the group stage of the 2017 AFC Champions League. Esteghlal also went to the play-offs for AFC Champions League because of their third position at the league.

Format
The tie was contested over one legs, simply to last edition. If the teams could still not be separated, then extra time would have been played with a penalty shootout (taking place if the teams were still level after that).

Pre-match

Match history
This was Zob Ahan's fifth Hazfi final and Esteghlal's ninth appearance in the final match of the tournament. Zob Ahan lastly won the cup in 2002–03, 2008–09 and 2014–15. Their other final appearance was in 2000–01 season where they lost to Fajr Sepasi.

Esteghlal didn't make it to the final of Hazfi Cup for four years, Esteghlal lately won the cup in 1977, 1996, 2000, 2002, 2008, and 2012, Esteghlal was runners-up four times.

Detalis

See also 
 2015–16 Iran Pro League
 2015–16 Azadegan League
 2015–16 Iran Football's 2nd Division
 2015–16 Iran Football's 3rd Division
 2015–16 Hazfi Cup
 Iranian Super Cup
 2015–16 Iranian Futsal Super League
 Esteghlal season
 Zob Ahan season

References

2016
Hazfi
Zob Ahan Esfahan F.C.
Esteghlal F.C. matches